"Forget Her" is a song by Jeff Buckley. The song was recorded during sessions for Buckley's only completed studio album Grace, but remained officially unreleased until it was featured as the opening track on the bonus disc of Grace: Legacy Edition, a 2004 remastered reissue of the album. The song was subsequently included as a bonus track on several European editions of the standard album. "Forget Her" was subject to much controversy because Buckley specifically chose not to use it for the final release of his debut Grace, opting instead for "So Real". A music video was created for the song, compiled from previously unreleased footage, and was included on the bonus DVD with Grace: Legacy Edition.

In Australia, the song was ranked #36 on Triple J's Hottest 100 songs of 2004.

Track listing
The song was released as a promotional-only CD single in the United States and Europe to coincide with the release of Grace: Legacy Edition. "Forget Her" was also pressed on blue-colored 7" vinyl and issued with the 2004 vinyl LP reissue of Grace.

U.S. promo CD (no catalog number)
 "Forget Her" (Radio Edit) – 4:32
 "Forget Her" (Album Version) – 5:12

U.S. 7" vinyl (CS7 54805)
 "Forget Her" – 5:12
 "Strawberry Street" – 5:26

References

2004 singles
Jeff Buckley songs
2004 songs
Columbia Records singles
Songs written by Jeff Buckley